The Muthanga Incident refers to an incident of police firing on the Adivasis (tribal clans) in the Muthanga village of Wayanad district, Kerala. On 19 February 2003, the Adivasis had gathered under Adivasi Gothra Maha Sabha (AGMS) to protest the Kerala Government's delay in allotting them land, which had been contracted in October 2001. During the protest, Kerala Police fired 18 rounds resulting in two immediate fatalities (one of which was a police officer). In a subsequent statement, the Government placed the official death toll at five. A video of the firing was aired on several news programs.

Background
The Adivasi people began to protest in August 2001 after many of their members had died of starvation in Kerala. The protest was carried out primarily by setting up "Refugee Camps" in front of AK Antony's (state chief minister) official residence. The protest continued for 48 days, forcing the Government of Kerala to promise the disbursement of land and other rehabilitation measures for the Adivasi people living in the state.

When no action was taken by the Indian National Congress led administration to make the promised measures, the tribal alliance (similar to tribal groups of the Nagarhole) renewed their protest. The indigenous people of Wayanad decided to enter the forest under the banner of Adivasi Gothra Maha Sabha (AGMS). The Muthanga forest where AGMS put up huts is recognized as the homeland of different Adivasi communities in Wayanad, such as the Tamil Nadu, the Karnataka, the Andhra Pradesh, the Adivasi and the Kerala. Adivasi families had been forcibly evicted from Muthanga during the 1960s after the area was declared a sanctuary and again in the 1980s to make way for eucalyptus plantations. The evicted tribal groups were compelled to live in difficult socioeconomic conditions as part of several other tribal colonies.

The Adivasi families who entered the forest sought to assert their traditional right over the Muthanga forests, by restarting the Adivasi Oorukootams  (similar to Panchayati raj) and setting up subsistence agriculture. A minimum program for Self Rule under the spirit of the Panchayati raj was drawn up. Maintaining a self-supporting and regenerative natural ecosystem, primarily with regard to water sources and vegetation, was an important goal of the Adivasi moving into the forest.

As part of the eviction, the Forest Department was alleged to set the Adivasi huts on fire and fed domesticated elephants with alcohol to induce the animals to attack Adivasi huts.

Incident
The operation to evict the tribals began in the morning with the Government forces, made up of personnel of the Police and Forest Departments, moving into the sanctuary around 9 a.m. A `check-post' put up by the Adivasi Gothra Maha Sabha to restrict entry of non-tribals was demolished.

The activists then retreated into the forest. A couple of kilometers into the sanctuary from the road, the large posse of government forces came face to face with nearly 200 tribal people and the battle broke out. Although teargas shells were fired into the air in an attempt to disperse the crowd, the agitators refused to disperse. Attempts to advance were met with stiff resistance. Tribals consisting of men and women of all ages surged forward, brandishing deadly weapons as they attempted to advance.

Aftermath
However, being outnumbered, the tribal agitators retreated. The activists struck again and information about two members of a small group sent to search for the tribals hiding inside the forests being taken hostage reached the authorities.

Police reinforcements sent to the area also ran into stiff resistance forcing them to open fire. The situation in the sanctuary is still tense. After the incident, actions by Police Forces of the Kerala State tribal members were arrested in connection with the eviction operation in Muthanga Wildlife Sanctuary in the Wayanad district. Police said that all the accused, along with 37 children, were deported to Central Jail in the Kannur district. A total of 33 men were charged under various sections of the Indian Penal Code (IPC) and 99 women were charged under sections of the Wildlife Protection Act. On 20 February 2003, 132 people were remanded to Judicial custody for 15 days, including 99 women volunteers of the Adivasi Gothra Maha Sabha (ADMS).

On 21 February 2003, AGMS leaders C. K. Janu and M. Geethanandan were arrested. The two were spotted by locals at a roadside, near Nambikolli, about 4 kilometers from the town of Sulthan Bathery on the Bathery-Ootty road. K. K. Surendran, a lecturer in DIET, was also arrested in connection with the tribal agitation in the sanctuary.

Then Chief Minister of the State of Kerala, A. K. Antony, rejected the demands of the opposition for a Judicial probe into the Muthanga action which led to the killing of two persons. The then United Democratic Front (UDF) convener, Oommen Chandy, added: "apart from the liberal attitude towards the tribes, the Government has already distributed 1800 acres of land to the landless tribals, besides allotting 60 million for tribal housing schemes. The Government is targeting 1840 acres to be distributed to tribals". Then Kerala Pradesh Congress Committee (KPCC) president K. Muraleedharan countered statements by the UDF leaders, stating that there is not enough land to distribute equitably among the tribal groups and that the calculations being cited are erroneous.

On 24 February 2003, social activist A. Vasu spoke to Janu and Geethanandan in Calicut District Jail. He quoted the agitation leaders as having said that nearly 15 persons were fatally wounded in the course of the police firing. After this information became public, the government issued a statement stating that the death toll was five.

See also
 List of cases of police brutality in India

References 

2003 in India
History of Kerala (1947–present)
Human rights abuses in India
Police misconduct in India
Scheduled Tribes of India
History of Wayanad district
Police brutality in India